Saxton United Methodist Church is a historic United Methodist church located at the junction of Main and Church Streets in Bowers, Kent County, Delaware. It was built in 1879, and is a long, narrow, one-story, gable-roofed, Gothic-influenced frame building with board-and-batten siding.  It measures approximately 40 feet, 5 inches, in length by 24 feet, 5 inches, in width.  The steeply pitched roof is topped by a pyramidal-roofed, bell cupola.  The church was moved to its present location in 1893.

It was added to the National Register of Historic Places in 1990.

References

United Methodist churches in Delaware
Carpenter Gothic church buildings in Delaware
Churches completed in 1893
19th-century Methodist church buildings in the United States
Churches in Kent County, Delaware
Churches on the National Register of Historic Places in Delaware
National Register of Historic Places in Kent County, Delaware